Tom Bambard (born in South Lyon, Michigan) is a former NASCAR driver and ice dancer.

He competed in two Craftsman Truck Series events in 1999. He made his debut at Louisville, running for Conely Motorsports. He started 28th, but finished 27th after radiator problems. Two races later, he finished 22nd at California, running the #23 Chevy for Team Racing.

As an ice dancer, he won three bronze medals before retiring in 1997.

References

External links 
Career Stats

Year of birth missing (living people)
American male ice dancers
Living people
NASCAR drivers
People from South Lyon, Michigan
Racing drivers from Michigan